Kissing the Pink are an English new wave and synth-pop band that formed in London in 1980. The current members are lead singer and guitarist Nick Whitecross, keyboardist Jon Kingsley Hall, second keyboardist George Stewart, and guitarist Simon Aldridge. Former members include saxophonist Josephine Wells, violinist Peter Barnett, drummer Stevie Cusack, and vocalist Sylvia Griffin.

Career
The band formed in 1980 at the Royal College of Music, located in South Kensington, London. Their debut single was "Don't Hide in the Shadows", recorded with producer Martin Hannett at Strawberry Studios in Stockport. Hannett had previously worked with Joy Division, the Durutti Column, and John Cooper Clarke, but it was not until they dropped their first manager (celebrated in their song "Michael"), and signed a recording contract with Magnet Records that they began to get any airplay. 
They recorded their debut studio album, Naked, at AIR Studios with Colin Thurston as the main producer. The group had wanted Brian Eno to produce the album but Magnet thought Thurston would make a more commercial impact. As well as investing in a renowned producer, Magnet paid for promotional videos to be made for the singles "Mr. Blunt" (shot at the Long Man of Wilmington) and "Watching Their Eyes". After these of near-misses, their single "The Last Film" reached the top 20 of the UK Singles Chart, their only hit in the UK.  Their album, Naked, reached No. 54 on the UK Albums Chart.

Their first Billboard Hot 100 entry was "Maybe This Day", which reached No. 87 in the chart in 1983. In 1984, they released their second album What Noise. This album did not attract as much attention and distribution was not as widespread as their other albums. It never received a worldwide release.

In 1985, following the departure of some of the members, the band shortened their name to KTP and released several singles that placed on the Hot Dance Music/Club Play chart. The most successful was "Certain Things Are Likely",  which spent three weeks at No. 1 in 1987. That song also became their second Hot 100 entry when it peaked at No. 97 on the chart later that year. From the same album, "One Step" was the biggest selling single in Italy that year.

In 1988, the band released the standalone single, "Stand Up (Get Down)", on a new label WEA; It would prove to be their only release on that label after it failed to chart, and they wouldn't release any more new material for five years.

Kissing the Pink's last physically-released album, Sugarland, which was their first in seven years, was a blend of psychedelic music and dance-pop. Since then, the band have made an album with Ecologist called Hot Filth which took the mixing of psychedelic music with jazz and other musical forms further still.

In 2015, KTP released two albums digitally on Bandcamp: Digital People, and FatHome.

Collaborations
Whitecross, Hall and Stewart collaborated on many dance records in the early 1990s, and made it to the top of the dance charts in 1994 with the artist Mike ("Twangling (Three Fingers in a Box)" on Pukka Records). They recorded an album in 2003 with jazz saxophonist Candy Dulfer called Right in My Soul. They also worked with Gareth Gates on his Pictures of the Other Side album. Whitecross has written a considerable amount of material for pop artists such as Kim Wilde (including her Top 40 hit "Heart over Mind"), Jem, Jaci Velasquez, Jonna Lee, Glen Scott, Leslie Clio, and Shea Seger. The band wrote and feature on four tracks on the X-Press 2 album Makeshift Feelgood, alongside Tim DeLaughter, Kurt Wagner and Rob Harvey from the Music.

Marchioness disaster
In 1989, former KTP saxophonist Jo Wells, who had gone on to tour with Tears for Fears and the Communards, was aboard a boat in the Marchioness disaster, which resulted in the deaths of 51 people. Afterward Wells suffered a nervous breakdown and turned to alcohol. She lost the control of her lip that is essential to players of woodwind instruments. She is now unable to work, has sold two of her saxophones, and lives on Income Support.

Discography

Studio albums

EPs

Singles

See also
List of number-one dance hits (United States)
List of artists who reached number one on the US Dance chart

References

External links
 
 
 
 
 Kissing the Pink on Facebook

Musical groups established in 1980
British synth-pop new wave groups
English new wave musical groups
English synth-pop groups
Atlantic Records artists
Magnet Records artists
Musical groups from London